Waverly is an unincorporated community and census-designated place (CDP) in Camden County, in the U.S. state of Georgia.

It was first listed as a CDP in the 2020 census with a population of 281.

History
A post office called Waverly was established in 1894. The community derives its name from Sir Walter Scott's Waverley novels.

Demographics

2020 census

Note: the US Census treats Hispanic/Latino as an ethnic category. This table excludes Latinos from the racial categories and assigns them to a separate category. Hispanics/Latinos can be of any race.

References

Populated coastal places in Georgia (U.S. state)
Census-designated places in Camden County, Georgia
Unincorporated communities in Camden County, Georgia